Live at Montreux is a posthumous live album released by Irish blues guitarist Rory Gallagher in 2006. It is a live collection recorded at the Montreux Jazz Festival in 1975, 1977, 1979 and 1985. The CD contains the 12 highlights from those shows.

Track listing
All tracks composed by Rory Gallagher; except where indicated
 "Laundromat" (1975) [from Rory Gallagher] - 7:49
 "Toredown" (Sonny Thompson) (1975) - 4:53
 "I Take What I Want" (1977) [from Against the Grain] - 5:59
 "Bought and Sold" (1977) [from Against the Grain] - 5:47
 "Do You Read Me" (1977) [from Calling Card] - 5:48
 "The Last of the Independents" (1979) [from Photo-Finish] - 5:59
 "Off The Handle" (1979) [from Top Priority] - 8:27
 "The Mississippi Sheiks" (1979) [from Photo-Finish] - 5:30
 "Out On The Western Plain" (Huddie Ledbetter) (1979) [from Against the Grain] - 5:23
 "Too Much Alcohol" (J.B. Hutto) (1979) - 5:02
 "Shin Kicker" (1985) [from Photo-Finish] - 7:05
 "Philby" (1985) [from Top Priority] - 8:16

Personnel
Rory Gallagher – guitars, vocals
Gerry McAvoy – bass guitar
Lou Martin – keyboards (1-5)
Rod de'Ath – drums, percussion (1-5)
Ted McKenna – drums (6-10)
Brendan O'Neill – drums, percussion (11-12)

Certifications

References

External links 
 Album's page at Rory Gallagher official site

2006 live albums
Rory Gallagher albums
Albums produced by Rory Gallagher
Albums recorded at the Montreux Jazz Festival
Live albums published posthumously
Eagle Records live albums